Peter Kelly (born 17 April 1989) is an Irish hurler who plays as a full-back for Dublin and Lucan Sarsfields.

County Hurling
He made his debut for Dublin in 2008 against Cork in the National Hurling League.

He won the National Hurling League with Dublin in 2011. He won an all star in 2013 after helping Dublin win the Leinster Senior Hurling Championship.

Honours
 Leinster Senior Hurling Championship (1): 2013
 1 All Star 2013
 National Hurling League Division 1B (1): 2013
 National Hurling League (1): 2011
 Leinster Under-21 Hurling Championship (1): 2010
 Leinster Minor Hurling Championship (1): 2007

References

1989 births
Living people
Dublin inter-county hurlers
Lucan Sarsfields hurlers